The University of South Carolina Upstate (USC Upstate) is a public university in Valley Falls, South Carolina, near Spartanburg and with a Spartanburg postal address. Founded in 1967 and formerly known as University of South Carolina Spartanburg, the institution changed its name in the summer of 2004. It offers bachelor's and master's degrees for students in the Upstate and surrounding areas. It is part of the University of South Carolina System and home to approximately 6,000 students and 340 full-time faculty. It is accredited by the Southern Association of Colleges and Schools.

History
After the Spartanburg General Hospital decided to discontinue its degree program for nurses, local politicians, led by Dr. G.B. Hodge, decided to create a separate University for the region. In 1967 the Spartanburg Regional Campus was opened as a two-year college with an initial enrollment of 177 students. Because of increased popularity, the school became a four-year institution in 1975 and was renamed as the University of South Carolina Spartanburg. During the following years, both the campus and the scope of the University expanded. 

In the summer of 2004 the USC Board of Trustees voted to change the name to the University of South Carolina Upstate to better reflect its mission to educate the people of South Carolina's upstate region. Aside from its presence in Spartanburg, University of South Carolina Upstate has become the largest educational provider in the University Center Greenville, a consortium of seven institutions of higher learning in Greenville, South Carolina and the immediate surrounding area.

Colleges and schools
 College of Arts, Social Science, and Humanities 
 College of Science and Technology
 Mary Black School of Nursing
 George Dean Johnson Jr., College of Business and Economics
 School of Education, Human Performance, and Health

Clubs, organizations, and teams
University of South Carolina Upstate has many clubs and organizations as well as academic teams whose main goals are the intellectual and interpersonal growth of students through community service and wide-ranging cultural activities.

IFC Greek-letter organizations for men
Active Fraternities
Alpha Sigma Phi

NPC Greek-letter organizations for women
Active Sororities
Delta Zeta
Phi Mu
Zeta Tau Alpha

NALFO Greek-letter organizations for women 

 Chi Upsilon Sigma

NPHC Greek-letter organizations for men and women

Active fraternities
Alpha Phi Alpha
Kappa Alpha Psi
Omega Psi Phi
Phi Beta Sigma

Active sororities
Alpha Kappa Alpha
Delta Sigma Theta
Zeta Phi Beta
Sigma Gamma Rho

Athletics

University of South Carolina Upstate sponsors 13 collegiate teams known as the Spartans. The athletic department colors are green, white, and black. The teams compete in the Big South Conference and Division I of the NCAA. These sports are men's and women's basketball, men's and women's soccer, men's and women's tennis, men's and women's golf, baseball, softball, track and field, cross country, and women's volleyball.

References

External links

USC Upstate Athletics website

 
University of South Carolina Upstate
University of South Carolina System
Educational institutions established in 1967
Buildings and structures in Spartanburg County, South Carolina
Universities and colleges accredited by the Southern Association of Colleges and Schools
Education in Spartanburg County, South Carolina
1967 establishments in South Carolina